Lietuvos paštas is the company responsible for postal service in Lithuania. The company was established on November 16, 1918, and this date celebrate as Post Lithuania day.

In 2018, Lithuanian Post consisted of 546 fixed post offices, 85 mobile service locations and 120 smart postmen in 12 districts.

History
On July 11, 1562, the Grand Duke of Lithuania and king of Poland Sigismund Augustus commissioned Christopher Taxis to organise a regular mail transport route Vilnius-Krakow-Vienna-Venice. At that time, letters between Krakow and Vilnius were delivered in 7 days.

The importance of post increased after 1583, when the Polish King Stefan Batory enforced standardised mail charges, thus providing universal access to mail. At that time, mail began to be delivered on a regular basis.

On November 16, 1918, the Lithuanian Ministry of Finance, Trade and Industry minister Martin Yčas signed a decree establishing a Lithuanian postal board. This date is considered the official founding day of Lithuanian postal history and is celebrated as national post day.

World War II destroyed Lithuanian international relations ending both postal and rail transport. Lithuanian Post activity became completely dependent on Moscow.

On October 7, 1990, mail came into circulation once again with the release of the first independent Lithuanian stamp series – "Angel". On December 17, 1991, Lithuania decided to reorganise the management structure of national communications, separating postal and electrical connections and forming two separate state enterprises: Lithuanian Post and Lietuvos Telekomas acting as the public telephony operator.

In 2006, the company was reorganised into a joint stock company.

The group of companies of Lietuvos paštas, which has the widest network of access points to services in the country, provides not only postal services, but also services of logistics, financial intermediation, and electronic services.

Board 
All shares of AB Lietuvos paštas are controlled by the State represented by the Ministry of Transport and Communications of the Republic of Lithuania.

The Company’s managerial body is the General Meeting of Shareholders, the Board and CEO. The Board consists of five members elected by the General Meeting of Shareholders for a term of four years.

External links 
 Official website

References 

Postal system of Lithuania
Service companies of Lithuania
Lithuania
Government-owned companies of Lithuania
Philately of Lithuania
1918 establishments in Lithuania
Companies based in Vilnius
Public utilities established in 1918